Richard Graham Frost (December 29, 1851 – February 1, 1900) was a U.S. Representative from Missouri.

Born in St. Louis, Missouri, Frost attended St. John's College, New York City, the University of London, and  St. Louis (Missouri) Law School.
He was admitted to the bar and practiced in St. Louis, Missouri.
He unsuccessfully contested as a Democrat the election in 1876 of Lyne S. Metcalfe to the Forty-fifth Congress.

Frost was elected as a Democrat to the Forty-sixth Congress (March 4, 1879 – March 3, 1881).
Presented credentials as a Member-elect to the Forty-seventh Congress and served from March 4, 1881, until March 2, 1883, when he was succeeded by Gustavus Sessinghaus, who contested his election.
He resumed the practice of law.
He died in St. Louis, Missouri, February 1, 1900.
He was interred in Calvary Cemetery.

References

1851 births
1900 deaths
Alumni of the University of London
St. John's University (New York City) alumni
Democratic Party members of the United States House of Representatives from Missouri
19th-century American politicians
Politicians from St. Louis